Cristiane is a Brazilian footballer who represents Brazil women's national football team as a forward. As of 23 December 2021, she has played for the senior national team in 151 matches. With 96 goals, she is the second-best top scorer of Brazil, only behind Marta.

International goals

Statistics

See also
 List of women's footballers with 100 or more international caps

References

Cristiane
Women's association football records and statistics
Brazil women's national football team
Cristiane goals